Harry Robinson Hamlin (born October 30, 1951) is an American actor, author, and entrepreneur. He is best known for his roles as Perseus in the 1981 fantasy film Clash of the Titans and as Michael Kuzak in the legal drama series L.A. Law, for which he received three Golden Globe nominations. For his recurring role as Jim Cutler on the AMC drama series Mad Men, Hamlin received a Primetime Emmy nomination for Outstanding Guest Actor in a Drama Series.

Early life
Hamlin was born October 30, 1951, in Pasadena, California, the son of Bernice (née Robinson), a socialite, and Chauncey Jerome Hamlin, Jr., an aeronautical engineer. As a teenager, he attended Flintridge Preparatory School, near Pasadena, and The Hill School, a private boarding school in Pottstown, Pennsylvania, where he played soccer and lacrosse and acted in the school's musicals and plays. He also attended classes at the Pacific Conservatory of the Performing Arts. Hamlin attended University of California, Berkeley, and is an alumnus of the Theta Zeta chapter of the national fraternity Delta Kappa Epsilon, of which he was president in 1972.

Hamlin graduated from Yale University in 1974 with dual Bachelor of Arts degrees in drama and psychology. He then attended the American Conservatory Theater's advanced actor training program, from which he was awarded a Master of Fine Arts degree in acting in 1976. There, Hamlin starred in a production of Equus, attracting the attention of director Stanley Donen.

Career

Film and television 
Hamlin appeared in the 1976 television production of Taming of the Shrew and also had the title role in the 1979 television miniseries Studs Lonigan. He starred in Movie Movie with George C. Scott in 1978, for which he received his first Golden Globe Award nomination. His big-screen break was a starring role in the 1981 Greek mythology fantasy epic Clash of the Titans. Afterwards, his career faltered somewhat with such controversial films as Making Love in 1982 (the first gay themed love story to be produced by a major studio, Twentieth Century Fox) and Blue Skies Again (1983). He returned to television appearing in the miniseries Master of the Game (based on the novel by Sidney Sheldon) in 1984 and Space (based on the novel by James A. Michener) in 1985.

Hamlin appeared on the NBC legal drama series L.A. Law, playing attorney Michael Kuzak. He remained on the series from 1986 to 1991 during which time he was voted People magazine's "Sexiest Man Alive" in 1987. Hamlin left the series at the end of the fifth season having been nominated three times for Best Actor in a Television Series - Drama by the Hollywood Foreign Press Association.

In early 1991 Hamlin appeared in the music video and sang in the choir on the song "Voices That Care" which was made in support of U.S. troops who were stationed in the Middle East and involved at that time in Operation Desert Storm. He then appeared in two 1992 episodes of Batman: The Animated Series, in each episode as a separate character. In the episode "Joker's Wild", Hamlin played the role of Cameron Kaiser, a ruthless businessman who sinks all his money into a casino, then counts on the Joker to destroy it in order to collect on the insurance policy from a reputable company, and in the other episode, "Moon of the Wolf", he provided the voice of Anthony Romulus, a greedy athlete who takes a potion to enhance his skills, only to realize too late that it has transformed him into a werewolf. In 1995, he participated in the documentary film, The Celluloid Closet where he discussed his role in the film Making Love.

In 2001, he starred in the television comedy Bratty Babies, and in 2002 he reprised the role of Michael Kuzak in an L.A. Law reunion television movie.

In 2004, Hamlin began a recurring role on the television series Veronica Mars. He played fading action hero Aaron Echolls, father to central show character Logan Echolls who had a turbulent relationship with him. Hamlin's character states that he (like the real-life Hamlin) was People magazine's 'Sexiest Man Alive' in 1987. Aaron's wife, Lynn, was played by Hamlin's real-life wife, Lisa Rinna. Hamlin appeared beginning in the sixth episode of the first season, "Return of the Kane", and made his last appearance in the second season finale, "Not Pictured". In 2006, Hamlin took part in the third season of Dancing with the Stars with Ashly DelGrosso, but was voted off the show in the third week.

In 2009, Hamlin starred in the series Harper's Island as Uncle Marty. He was killed abruptly in the first episode by being cut in half while he dangled from a broken wooden bridge.

In June 2010, Hamlin guest-starred in an episode of Army Wives and then became a recurring cast member.

In June 2010, Hamlin starred in the Hallmark Channel movie You Lucky Dog.

On December 4, 2008, TV Guide reported that Hamlin and Rinna signed a deal to create a reality television series called Harry Loves Lisa that is based around their family life. The series was developed by TV Land and premiered on October 6, 2010.

In 2012, Hamlin began playing Lloyd Lishman, an older lover to Ian Gallagher (Cameron Monaghan) on the U.S version of Shameless (7 episodes circa the end of Season 3). Hamlin appeared in an adult diaper commercial with his wife during a primetime television program.

Beginning on April 28, 2013, Hamlin appeared in several episodes of season six (1968) of Mad Men as ad executive Jim Cutler after the merger of Sterling Cooper Draper Pryce and Cutler Gleason and Chaough. Hamlin was nominated for a 2013 Primetime Emmy Award for Outstanding Guest Actor in a Drama Series for his appearance in "A Tale of Two Cities".

In 2016, Hamlin was cast in the Epix comedy Graves starring Nick Nolte, and in 2017, Hamlin was cast as Addison Hayes, a mysterious and powerful mastermind whose agenda collides with Swagger, in the USA Network show Shooter.

In 2022, Hamlin was cast as Cortland Mayfair in AMC’s Mayfair Witches, based on the gothic supernatural trilogy Lives of the Mayfair Witches by author Anne Rice.

Stage 
Hamlin made his Broadway debut in 1982 playing Moe Axelrod opposite Frances McDormand in the Broadway revival of Clifford Odets' Awake and Sing!.

An avid Shakespearean actor, Hamlin played the title role in Hamlet at the famed McCarter Theater in Princeton, New Jersey, where he would go on to play Faust in Dr. Faustus the following year.

In 1994, Hamlin received a Helen Hayes Award nomination for his portrayal of the title role in Henry V at the prestigious Shakespeare Theater Company in Washington, DC.

In 1996, Hamlin returned to Broadway as Michael Buchanan in Tennessee Williams' Summer and Smoke at the Roundabout Theater.

Other work
Hamlin reprised the role of Perseus in the 2007 video game God of War II. In the game, Perseus was trapped in a room while searching for the Sisters of Fate to revive his dead lover, and believes Kratos to be sent by the gods to test him.

In 2010, Hamlin authored Full Frontal Nudity: The Making of an Accidental Actor, published by Scribner, wherein he shares stories of his early life before becoming a film actor.

Entrepreneurship 
Hamlin is an advocate for fusion power and was an angel investor and co-founder of TAE Technologies, formerly known as Tri Alpha Energy. TAE Technologies states that it is in the final stages of the research and development of a clean, non-radioactive fusion power generator.

Hamlin delivered a talk on Fusion at the TEDX LA conference in 2016 entitled, "You Don't Have To Be A Rocket Scientist To Be A Futurist!" Hamlin was also a board member of Advanced Physics Corporation.

Hamlin was President and CEO of the Belle Gray women’s clothing boutiques in Los Angeles. Hamlin launched The Lisa Rinna Collection with Lisa Rinna for QVC in 2012.

Hamlin is also on the Board of Governors of the National Space Society.

Personal life

Hamlin was in a relationship with Ursula Andress after meeting on the set of Clash of the Titans in 1979. She gave birth to their son in 1980. Although an engagement was announced, the couple never married. In 1983, Hamlin broke up with her.

From 1985 to 1989, he was married to actress Laura Johnson and, between 1991 and 1992, to actress Nicollette Sheridan.

Since 1997 Hamlin has been married to Days of Our Lives actress and television host Lisa Rinna after meeting in 1993. They have two daughters born 1998 and 2001, who both appeared in the reality shows Harry Loves Lisa and The Real Housewives of Beverly Hills with their parents. The couple also starred in the first season of Veronica Mars as Aaron and Lynn Echolls, a married couple.  They also starred as a married couple in the 2001 Lifetime movie Sex, Lies, and Obsession.

Hamlin's wives have each been prominent prime time soap-opera actresses: Rinna starred on Melrose Place, Sheridan was a regular on Knots Landing, Desperate Housewives, and the Dynasty reboot, and Johnson was a regular on Falcon Crest (on which Andress later made guest appearances).

Filmography

Film

Television films

Television series

Video games

Awards and nominations

References

External links

Harry Hamlin on Worldcat (libraries)
Dancing with the Stars page on Hamlin

1951 births
Male actors from Pasadena, California
American male film actors
American male stage actors
American male television actors
American people of English descent
American people of Scottish descent
The Hill School alumni
Living people
Participants in American reality television series
20th-century American male actors
21st-century American male actors
Yale University alumni
American male Shakespearean actors
Fraternity Leadership Association
American Conservatory Theater alumni